The 1900 Washington & Jefferson football team was an American football team that represented Washington & Jefferson College as an independent during the 1900 college football season.  Led by J.R Beardsley in his first and only year as head coach, the team compiled a record of 6–3–1. Beardsley was a graduate of Princeton University and played on the 1899 Princeton Tigers football team.

Schedule

References

Washington and Jefferson
Washington & Jefferson Presidents football seasons
Washington and Jefferson football